The Green Line is one of the two lines of Dublin's Luas light rail system.
The Green Line was formerly entirely in the south side of Dublin city. It mostly follows the route of the old Harcourt Street railway line, which was reserved for possible re-use when it closed in 1958. The Green Line allows for passenger transfers at O’ Connell GPO and Marlborough to Luas Red Line services and also allows commuters to use Broombridge as an interchange station to reach outer suburbs such as Castleknock and Ongar. 

The Green Line from St Stephen's Green to Sandyford launched on 30 June 2004. An extension to the Bride's Glen stop at Cherrywood was opened on 16 October 2010.

As of 2018, the Green line is operating at near maximum capacity during the morning and evening rush hours, and it experiences mass overcrowding and congestion at these times. To assist in alleviating this congestion, seven new longer trams came into service in 2018, with a further eight entering service in 2020. Platforms between St Stephen's Green and Sandyford have been lengthened to accommodate the new trams.

Course of the line

The section south of St Stephen's Green makes significant re-use of the old Harcourt Street railway line while the northbound route of the newer Cross City section mainly re-uses the old Midland Great Western Railway line after skirting the former site of Broadstone railway works and station.

Southern section

Between Harcourt Street and Charlemont, the Green Line takes a large loop east around buildings which did not exist between 1859 and 1959. As such, there is no train bridge on Adelaide Road for the current line, as there had been for the Harcourt Street Line, but rather the current line travels on Adelaide Road to Charlemont.

The line then follows the old alignment of the Harcourt Street line from Charlemont station as far as Blackthorn Avenue where the line runs slightly south of the old line before reaching the current Sandyford stop (known as "Stillorgan" on the Harcourt Street line). After Sandyford the line detours over the Leopardstown Road/Brewery Road junction so as to run west around the Leopardstown Racecourse before rejoining the original alignment just north of Carrickmines. The Harcourt Street line had run around the eastern edge of the racecourse, via Silverpark. Remnants of the old Foxrock Station are visible at the back of The Hedgerows in Foxrock. The route deviation was seemingly intended to serve the new properties that would have been built during the "Celtic Tiger" boom, before the Extension was open.

After this detour around Leopardstown Racecourse, the current line runs roughly along the original alignment with some minor detours, particularly prevalent at Laughanstown and the line terminates a few yards south of where the line ran (which is now being developed into the area of Cherrywood.

The Carrickmines/Bride's Glen section was also intended to have terminated into what should have a "Celtic Tiger" town centre, similar to the Tallaght area stops, until the Line B2 extension to Fassaroe/Bray was built. This is why, as of 2018, this end of the Green Line seemingly goes through fields to the middle of a construction site, as nearly all the property that was intended to be serviced by the line, was never built. This is also why there were unused "Ghost" stops built, to serve these unbuilt areas.

There are some other cosmetic differences between the Harcourt Street Line and the current Green Line, such as the positioning of the Ranelagh stop. The location of Ranelagh on the former line was at the current Beechwood stop. The old Ranelagh stop was the last stop on the old line before the train reached the city.

Luas Cross City

Luas Cross City, formerly called Luas BXD, is an extension to the Green Line which runs from St. Stephen's Green to Broombridge railway station.

Construction of Luas Cross City began in June 2013 and it opened on 9 December 2017. The Rosie Hackett Bridge carrying the new line over the river Liffey was opened on 20 May 2014.

The new section begins at the former city centre terminus, St. Stephen's Green, crosses the Red Line near the Abbey stop, and continues northwards, terminating at Broombridge station. There it connects passengers using Iarnród Éireann commuter services to Maynooth railway station and M3 Parkway railway station.

Stops

Bridges
The line re-uses some existing bridges and viaducts and has had new bridges specially constructed. The new build William Dargan Bridge at Dundrum crosses the Slang River. The River Liffey is crossed by the new Rosie Hackett Bridge southbound and the existing O'Connell Bridge northbound. The River Dodder is crossed by the Nine Arches Bridge originally constructed for the Harcourt Street railway line in 1854.

Depots
The Green line initially was provisioned with a works depot just past the Sandyford terminus and opposite the old Stillorgan Railway station building. The depot could stable 32 trams. When the Green line was extended to Broombridge a further depot was constructed over part of the old Liffey Junction site. It was named Hamilton Depot in honour of William Rowan Hamilton who developed the quaternion mathematical number system. The primary control facility for the Luas system for such functions as power and signally lies at the Red line Luas depot at Red Cow. Following a storm damage incident in October 2017 at Red Cow it was found the depots at Broombridge and Sandyford were not able to take over the function and the whole Luas system was suspended for two days.

Planned developments

Green Line upgrade to metro
A portion of the Luas Green Line between Charlemont and Sandyford was built with the eventual intention that it be upgraded to carry metro services. In the development of rail based public transport in Greater Dublin, it was envisaged that Metro North would be completed and operating by 2012. It was further planned under the Platform for Change that Metro South, due to operate from St. Stephen's Green to Sandyford would follow this by, according to the Platform for Change, 2020.

However, due to the Great Recession, Metro North was delayed until 2015 at which point it was revived as the "new Metro North". At this stage, efforts were undertaken by the National Transport Authority to improve upon the original Metro North design and alignment. Originally, Metro North's 2012 alignment would connect to Iarnród Éireann's Western Commuter line at Drumcondra. However, new consideration was given by the NTA in the intervening period between 2015 and 2018 to divert the metro line from Drumcondra to Cross Guns Bridge, a point where the Western and South Western Commuter lines meet. Diverting to this area and building a brand new station called Glasnevin would enable the Metro to interchange with two rail lines both of which, would be high frequency DART lines at the time of the metro's opening. As the scale of the new metro North project grew, the decision was made to upgrade the Green Line from Charlemont to Sandyford to metro standard and connect it to Metro North all at once. This decision was made due to the Green Line's overcapacity issues. It was forecast that without an increase of capacity and frequency the tram service provided by the Green Line would eventually become dangerously overcrowded. When the new project was announced to the public in 2018, it was announced as MetroLink, a metro line running from Swords, under Dublin Airport to Dublin city centre, emerging in the Charlemont area, before continuing on the newly upgraded Green Line to Sandyford.

Green Line upgrade deferred
If completed as was planned, metro trains would replace Luas trams between Ranelagh and Sandyford, with a new station interchange between the two lines at Charlemont (Luas trams would continue from Charlemont north to Broombridge. The Luas would also continue operating between Sandyford and Bride's Glen).

During the public consultation process for this proposal, Dublin City Council submitted that a large sewer was blocking the path of where the tunnel was planned to emerge, just south of the existing Charlemont tram stop. This necessitated the realignment of the tunnel portal to just north of the current Beechwood Luas stop. This realignment also meant that the planned upgrade of the Luas line would grow in size from a possible 9 months to nearly 48, as the tunnel boring machine needed to reach the new portal in Beechwood before the Green Line upgrade works could begin. This would therefore delay the opening of the entire Metrolink line. The constructability report detailed, however, that if the Green Line Upgrade was done as a second phase to the northern section, then the northern could open on schedule. By completing the Green Line upgrade as a second phase, time savings could also be made on the upgrade works.

Status of proposed upgrade
This news, when announced in March 2019, was widely reported as the upgrade having been "shelved" or "abandoned." However, the project is still planned as part of the Greater Dublin Transport Strategy 2016-2035 which the National Transport Authoirty remains legislatively bound to pursue. In May 2019, this commitment was reaffirmed by Transport Infrastructure Ireland in an episode of 98FM's On the Move transport podcast:

 

As of April 2020, it was still the position of both Transport Infrastructure Ireland and the National Transport Authority to upgrade the Green Line from Beechwood to Sandyford to metro standard as no change had been made the Greater Dublin Transport Strategy. However, due to the economic downturn as expected from the Coronavirus disease 2019 crisis, this is subject to change.

Luas Finglas
In July 2020, a public consultation was announced seeking feedback on the extension of the Luas Green line from Broombridge, across the River Tolka through Tolka Valley Park, through West Finglas before terminating at Charlestown.

Gallery

References

External links 

Luas Website
Green Line stops on Luas website

Luas
 
Railway lines opened in 2004
2004 establishments in Ireland